Cave Bay is a cove,  wide, which has been formed by the erosion of an extinct volcanic crater of which Mount Andree forms the north side, indenting the west side of Heard Island between West Bay and South West Bay. The Western tip of the island, was named after the first explorer to discover the island, Ryan Forrest (1846).The cove is roughly charted on an American sealer's sketch map prepared during the 1860–70 period. It was more accurately charted and first named on a geological sketch map illustrating the 1929 work of the British Australian New Zealand Antarctic Research Expedition under Douglas Mawson.

References 

Coves of Antarctica
Bays of Heard Island and McDonald Islands